Yves Saint Laurent is a 2014 French biographical drama film directed by Jalil Lespert and co-written with Jacques Fieschi, Jérémie Guez, and Marie-Pierre Huster. The film is based on the life of Yves Saint Laurent from 1958. The film stars Pierre Niney, Guillaume Gallienne, Charlotte Le Bon, Laura Smet, Marie de Villepin, Xavier Lafitte, and Nikolai Kinski.

The film opened the Panorama Special section of the 64th Berlin International Film Festival at the renovated Zoo Palast, with director, cast, and Pierre Bergé in attendance. The film received seven nominations at the 40th César Awards, winning Best Actor for Pierre Niney.

Premise
Yves Saint Laurent and Pierre Bergé promote the French fashion industry and stay friends against all odds.

Cast

Production
In March 2013, The Weinstein Company acquired the rights to the film to distribute in the United States, while Entertainment One holds U.K., Australian and Benelux distribution rights, including Canadian distribution rights.

Filming

Principal photography began in June 2013. Part of the filming was done with Bergé, who sent "out models on the runway for a reconstitution of Saint Laurent's famous Opéra Ballets Russes collection of 1976, which was filmed at the fashions show's original venue, the Westin hotel (formerly known as the InterContinental.)" Bergé's foundation loaned the film "77 vintage outfits from its archives and allowed Lespert to film certain scenes at its headquarters on Avenue Marceau in Paris." Bergé "praised Lespert's film—based largely on a Laurence Benaïm biography of Saint Laurent and Bergé's reminiscences in his book Letters to Yves—for showing the designer's demons." Bergé said "...there are details I don't like, but that is of no importance whatsoever. You have to take the movie as it is—as a whole."

Reception
Yves Saint Laurent received mixed reviews. On film aggregation website Rotten Tomatoes, it holds a rating of 45%, with an average score of 5.3/10, based on reviews from 65 critics. The site's consensus reads "While it boasts its share of fine performances, Yves Saint Laurent is also disappointingly bland and formulaic – especially given its subject's dazzling reputation." On another website, Metacritic, it has a score of 51/100 (indicating "mixed or average"), based on reviews from 25 critics.

Guy Lodge from Variety stated in 2014, "considerably less innovative than its human subject", "disappointingly by-the-numbers treatment" and "awkwardly structured".

References

External links
 
 
 
 
 

2014 films
2014 biographical drama films
2014 LGBT-related films
2014 multilingual films
2010s Arabic-language films
2010s English-language films
2010s French films
2010s French-language films
2010s Japanese-language films
2010s Russian-language films
Biographical films about LGBT people
English-language French films
Films about fashion designers
Films about fashion in France
Films based on biographies
Films directed by Jalil Lespert
Films featuring a Best Actor César Award-winning performance
Films set in 1958
Films shot in Morocco
Films shot in Paris
French biographical drama films
French LGBT-related films
French multilingual films
LGBT-related drama films
Yves Saint Laurent (brand)
Cultural depictions of French men